Goyang (Goyang-si) is a city in Gyeonggi Province in the north of South Korea. It is part of the Seoul Capital Area, making Goyang one of Seoul's satellite cities. It is one of the largest cities in the Seoul Capital Area, with a population of just over 1 million. Ilsan, a planned city, is located in the Ilsandong-gu and Ilsanseo-gu districts of Goyang. It also includes Deogyang-gu which is closer to Seoul.

Several institutions of higher learning are located in Goyang. These include Agricultural Cooperative College, Korea Aerospace University, and Transnational Law and Business University.

Notable places 

Historic remains
 Bukhansanseong Fortress
 Heungguksa Temple
 Seosamneung and Seooreung Royal Tombs, UNESCO World Heritage Sites
 Haengju seowon (Confucial Academy)
 Ilsan Bamgasi Choga (Straw-roofed House)

Exhibitions 
 Goyang Aram Nuri Arts Center
 Goyang Oulim Nuri Arts Center
 KINTEX
 Aerospace Museum
 Baedari Korean Traditional Wine Museum
 Theme Zoo Park "Zoo Zoo"
 Cultural Center and Museum of Latin America
 Nongshim Theme Park
 Hyundai Motor Studio Goyang
 Hanhwa Aqua Planet aquarium

Entertainment and shopping

 MBC Dream Center
 SBS Broadcasting Center
 Western Dorm
 Lafesta
 Lotte Department Store
 Hyundai Department Store
 New-Core Outlet
 Hwajeong station
 Starfield Goyang
 IKEA Goyang

Leisure
 Bukhan Mountain
 Jeongbal Mountain
 Go Bong Mountain
 Lake Park
 Goyang Sports Complex

Regular festivals 
 Haengjusanseong Fortress Sun Rise Festival
On New Year's Day each year, a splendid festival is thrown at Haengju Sanseong to welcome the New Year's Day sunrise.

Time: 5:00-9:00 AM on New Year's Day each year
Place: The top of the mountain where Haengju Sanseong sits.

 The Great Battle of Haengju Festival
The event is held to commemorate an important victory in Korean history (14 March) at Haengju Sanseong. Elementary school kids and their parents from the neighborhood can watch memorial services for patriotic martyrs of the nation and learn about the history of Haengju Sanseong.

Time: 10 AM on 14 March each year
Place: Chungjang Shrine at Haengju Sanseoeng

 Goyang International Flower Festival
Floricultural industry sprang up in the early 1970s fostering flower culture in Korea. Goyang became one of the most famous cities for its floricultural industry and its flower show grew into a horticultural event representing Korea and a venue for trading among participants at home and from abroad.

-Time: early April each year 
-Place: Areas surrounding Ilsan Lake Park

 Goyang Lake Art Festival
The event is free-style arts festival held at various locations around the Lake Park. Imagination and wits of artists getting out of the constraints imposed by stages fill the streets with vigor and romantic mood. Various performing arts including jazz, mime, dance, drama and installation arts decking out the venue with colorful decorations to add glamour, passionate performance by famous theatrical companies from around the world and fancy fireworks all let the cheerful spectators enjoy the excitement thrown by the festival.

Time: October each year
Place: locations around the Lake Park

Geography 

Ilsan New Town vaguely comes to mind, but in reality, the eastern boundary is Bukhansan, the western boundary is the Han River, and the city area itself is large and has various geographical features. However, Bukhansan is a region protruding to the east, and the eastern end of the border with Seoul is actually a hilly area connecting Mt. Aengbong and Mt. Bongsan. Across the Han River to the west is the city of Gimpo.

At the time of the expansion of Seoul, the eastern area was given to Seoul, but Bukhansan was guided, so if you look closely at the administrative divisions on the map, it looks like a kitchen knife or a stake. Bukhansan Mountain is clearly visible from the vicinity of Jichuk, and surprisingly, if you drive along the freeway from the middle floor of an apartment building in Ilsan New Town [10] or even from the side of Isanpo, you can see Bukhansan Mountain in the distance. You can roughly estimate the weather on that day by whether you can see it well or not.

Climate 
Goyang has a monsoon-influenced humid continental climate (Köppen: Dwa) with cold, dry winters and hot, rainy summers.

Sports 

The ice hockey team High1, based in Chuncheon, played its home Asia League Ice Hockey matches at the Goyang Ice Rink until 2019, when the team withdrew from the league.

Former association football teams in Goyang include Goyang KB Kookmin Bank FC and Goyang Zaicro FC. Currently, there is the K4 League association football team Goyang Citizen FC.

The Korean Basketball League team Goyang Carrot Jumpers is also based in the city.

Transport

Public transport

Bike sharing 
Goyang is served by a bike sharing system called Fifteen (KR:피프틴) which stands at around 3,000.

Railroads 
Subway
 Line 3: Jichuk~Daehwa
 Gyeongui-Jungang Line : Hwajeon~Tanhyeon
Commuter Rail
 Gyeongui Line: Hwajeon~Tanhyeon (Neunggok for DMZ Train)
High Speed Railways
 Gyeongbu, Honam, Jeolla, Gyeongjeon and Donghae : Haengsin Station

Buses 
Bus stops on Goyang Bus Rapid Transit (BRT)
 Daehwa Station
 Ilsanseo-gu office, Paik Hospital
 Ilsandong-gu office
 Daegok Station
 Haengsin dong
 Deogeun dong

Types of buses
 Yellow bus: connects nearby
 Green and Blue bus: connects cities 
and districts.
 Red Bus: express one, goes a wide area.
 M bus: more express one, goes a wide area, but not included in G bus and Seoul bus

Bus Terminals
 Hwajeong terminal: located in Deogyang-gu
 Goyang terminal: located in Ilsandong-gu
 Wide-area transportation connecting Seoul and Paju, etc., is developed. Goyang Terminal and Hwajeong Terminal are in charge of intercity transportation, and those who need to use regular trains tend to go to Seoul Station or Yongsan Station. However, there is a station attached to the KTX depot, so some KTX trains stop.

Notable people from Goyang 
Do Kyung-soo – singer, dancer, model, actore and member of (EXO)
 Jinjin - rapper and leader of  Astro
 RM – rapper and leader of BTS
 Empress Gi – empress of the Yuan dynasty
 Heo Young-ji – singer, television personality and former member of Kara
 Ha Sung-woon - singer and member of Wanna One and Hotshot
 Yohan Hwang - South Korean OPM Singer, I Love OPM Finalist and Winner; segment in ABS-CBN.
 Jay B – singer and leader of Got7
 Jang Mi-ran – weightlifter
 Jeon So-min – actress, model, entertainer
 Jung Wooyoung - singer and member of Ateez
 Kang Min-hyuk – musician, drummer, singer-songwriter, actor and member of CNBLUE 
 Kim Da-som – singer, actress and former member of Sistar
 Kim Hyun-joo – actress
 Kim Junsu – singer, model, dancer, stage actor, member of JYJ and former member of TVXQ
 Kwon Yu-ri – singer and member of Girls' Generation
 Lee Do-hyun – actor
 Lee Jun-ho – singer, songwriter, dancer, composer, actor and member of 2PM
 Lee Jung-shin – musician, bassist, singer, rapper, actor and member of CNBLUE
 Eunhyuk - singer, rapper, actor, member of Super Junior
 Sungmin – singer, songwriter, actor, member of Super Junior
 Young K - bassist, vocalist, rapper and member of Day6
 Qri – singer, actress, leader and member of T-ara and its sub-group QBS
 Song Ji-hyo – actress
 Yoon Doo-joon – singer, actor and member of Highlight
 Yuju – singer and member of GFriend
 Park Ye-eun – singer and former Wonder Girls member
 Kihyun - singer and member of Monsta X
 Ju Yeon-ho – singer and member of VERIVERY

International relations

Twin towns – sister cities 

Goyang is twinned with:

  Hakodate, Japan (2011)
  Heerhugowaard, Netherlands (1997)
  Eisenstadt, Austria (2012)
  Loudoun County, United States (2013)
  Maui County, United States (2012)
  Qiqihar, China (1998)
  San Bernardino, United States (2003)
  Uljin, South Korea
  Yeonggwang, South Korea
  Sinan, South Korea
  Gimhae, South Korea
  Buan, South Korea
  Jecheon, South Korea
  Asan, South Korea

Friendship cities 

  Aguascalientes City, Mexico (2002)
  Binzhou, China (2006)
  Dundgovi Province, Mongolia (2009)
  Kunming, China (2001)
  Sabadell, Spain (2001)
  Virginia Beach, United States (2005)
  Yanji, China (2007)

Administrative districts 
 Ilsanseo-gu (Ilsan Westside)
 Ilsandong-gu (Ilsan Eastside)
 Deogyang-gu

See also 
 List of cities in South Korea
 Geography of South Korea
 Seoul National Capital Area
 Goyang Geumjeong Cave Massacre

References

External links 

 
 The Official Website of Goyang City 

 
Cities in Gyeonggi Province